Hédipo Gustavo da Conceiçao (born 7 February 1988), commonly known as Hédipo, is a Brazilian professional footballer who plays as a attacking midfielder for Thai League 3 club Pattani.

Career statistics

Club

Notes

References

1988 births
Living people
Brazilian footballers
Brazilian expatriate footballers
Association football forwards
Sinop Futebol Clube players
Clube Náutico Marcílio Dias players
Juazeiro Social Clube players
São Carlos Futebol Clube players
Shan United F.C. players
Persela Lamongan players
KF Feronikeli players
Southern Myanmar F.C. players
Kalteng Putra F.C. players
Bhayangkara F.C. players
Becamex Binh Duong FC players
SHB Da Nang FC players
Persipura Jayapura players
Myanmar National League players
Liga 1 (Indonesia) players
Football Superleague of Kosovo players
V.League 1 players
Brazilian expatriate sportspeople in Myanmar
Expatriate footballers in Myanmar
Brazilian expatriate sportspeople in Indonesia
Expatriate footballers in Indonesia
Brazilian expatriate sportspeople in Kosovo
Expatriate footballers in Kosovo
Brazilian expatriate sportspeople in Guatemala
Expatriate footballers in Guatemala
Brazilian expatriate sportspeople in East Timor
Expatriate footballers in East Timor
Brazilian expatriate sportspeople in Vietnam
Expatriate footballers in Vietnam